The Parliament of the Chechen Republic is the regional parliament of Chechnya, a federal subject of Russia. A total of 41 deputies are elected for five-year terms.

The modern Chechen parliament was established in 2003 after the Constitution of Chechnya was approved in a referendum.

History

After the 1917 establishment of the USSR, the local parliament, the Supreme Soviet of the Chechen Autonomous Oblast merged with Ingushetia, forming the Supreme Soviet of the Chechen-Ingush Autonomous Soviet Socialist Republic. The parliament met twice a year for short sessions.

In autumn 1995, the pro-Russian Chechen administration led by Doku Zavgaev convened the body with most of the deputies of the old. In June 1996 they held elections to the bicameral National Assembly, which stopped functioning in August 1996, when the control of the republic was in the hands of the separatists and the majority of the elected deputies left Chechnya.

During January and February 1997, another election was conducted to the parliament of Ichkeria. It consists of about 50 members and is headed by Ruslan Alikhadjiyev. He disappeared almost immediately after the start of the second Chechen war. In the fall of 1999 the old Supreme Council of the Chechen-Ingush, ASSR, tried to gather for the third time. The chairmen of two of its chambers gathered in Moscow with the remaining deputies and created the so-called Chechen State Council, headed by businessman Malik Saidullayev. This initiative, however, was not supported by the Russian leadership, which chose to re-create the local administration. It was headed by the former Mufti of Ichkeria, Akhmad Kadyrov.

Following the Constitution that was adopted in 2003, a bicameral parliament amendment was introduced. In December 2007, a constitutional referendum abolished the upper house.

Elections

2008

2013

2016

2021

References

Chechnya
Politics of Chechnya
Chechen